The United Government of New Zealand was the government of New Zealand from 1928 to 1931, defeating the long-lived Reform Government. The United Party had been formed in 1927 from the remnants of the Liberal Party under Sir Joseph Ward, who had made a political comeback. They did not manage an outright win, but formed a government with Labour Party support. However, Ward was in poor health and was eventually succeeded by George Forbes. The new cabinet was notable for its inexperience, with four ministers not having sat in the House of Representatives previously.

Significant policies

Economic
During the election campaign, Ward startled both his supporters and his audience by promising to borrow £70 million in a year to revive the economy; while this is believed to have been a mistake caused by Ward's failing eyesight, or was intended to be £70 million over eight to ten years, borrowed at £6 to £8 million per year (possibly a sympathetic amendment by the newspaper), it was popular with the electorate. Labour lost two urban seats: Auckland East (John A. Lee) and Grey Lynn (Fred Bartram), and many town workers and unionists must have heard "the musical chink of the seventy million". ... More by accident than design United seems to have manage to recreate to some extent the old Liberal combination of urban worker and rural support. In the circumstances it was ephemeral. Chapman says that it is now clear that Ward inadvertently substituted 'seventy' for 'seven' when reading out the amount he would borrow in the first twelve months, and the correction to seventy millions spread over ten or eight years actually represented a shade less than Reform had already raised. But Reform's tactic of emphasising the larger amount backfired as many voters did not share Reform's financial orthodoxy. Ward amended the loan scheme in his final address in Dunedin to raise the sixty million portion for settlers by issuing bonds over the counter like packets of tea, and said that United would vote with Labour to oust the (Reform) Government. The resulting three-party vote astounded everyone, and was similar to 1919.

Formation

Defeat

Electoral results

Prime ministers
The government was led by Sir Joseph Ward from 1928 to 1930, and then George Forbes from 1930 to 1931. Wilson gives the dates of office-holding as 10 December 1928 to 28 May 1930 for the Ward Ministry, and 28 May 1930 to 22 September 1931 for the Forbes Ministry.

Cabinet ministers

See also
 Governments of New Zealand
 New Zealand Liberal Party
 Reform Party (New Zealand)

Further reading

References

Ministries of George V
Governments of New Zealand
New Zealand Liberal Party
Reform Party (New Zealand)
20th century in New Zealand
1928 establishments in New Zealand
1931 disestablishments in New Zealand
Cabinets established in 1928
Cabinets disestablished in 1931